Banning High School is a public high school in Banning, California. It is part of the Banning Unified School District.

Athletics
The Banning Broncos are a member of the Desert Valley League of the CIF Southern Section. The school has won 6 CIF Championships.

 1957 Boys' Basketball
 1975 Boys' Basketball
 1982 Boys' Basketball
 1988 Boys' Basketball
 1995 Track and Field
 2020 Boys' Basketball

Notable alumni
 Kevin Swayne (Class of 1992)  American football player, played 52 straight weeks of football in 2001 in the NFL, AFL, and XFL

References

High schools in Riverside County, California
Public high schools in California